Edward Rapallo (1 March 1914 – 6 February 1984) was the third Gibraltarian born Roman Catholic Bishop of Gibraltar following in the footsteps of Bishop Scandella and his successor Bishop Canilla.

Biography
Rapallo was born in Gibraltar on 1 March 1914 and had been ordained a priest by the time he was 23. He served 46 years as a priest with over ten of them as Bishop of Gibraltar. The ceremony to establish him as Bishop had been conducted inside the RAF Gibraltar aircraft hangar.

Rapallo died suddenly in Gibraltar on 6 February 1984. Michael Bowen, Archbishop of Southwark, who had assisted at his consecration as bishop in 1973, returned to the Rock for his funeral. Bowen praised Rapallo's pastoral skills and his ability to bring together the Jewish, Indian and Christian communities of Gibraltar.

Legacy
Rapallo was responsible for establishing Our Lady of Europe as one of the patron saint of Gibraltar and petitioned to have her feast day moved to 5 May to coincide with Europe Day. Rapallo also reconsecrated the Shrine of Our Lady of Europe. 
A pedestrianised street next to the Cathedral of St. Mary the Crowned in Gibraltar, was renamed Bishop Rapallo's Ramp (formerly Church Lane).

References

1914 births
1984 deaths
20th-century Roman Catholic bishops of Gibraltar